Knave may refer to:

A rogue (vagrant), a rascal, deceitful fellow, a dishonest man
Knave (playing card), another name for the jack in card games
Knave (British magazine), a British softcore pornographic magazine published 1968-2015
Knave (American magazine), a short-lived American men's magazine published in 1959
The Knave, a Welsh hillfort also known as Deborah's Hole Camp
In Knights and Knaves logic puzzles, a person who always lies
A male domestic worker, a person who works within the employer's household (kitchen boy in Middle English)

See also
Jack (playing card)
Knave of Hearts (disambiguation)
Varlet (disambiguation)